The Tacoma Art Museum (TAM) is an art museum in Tacoma, Washington, United States. It focuses primarily on the art and artists from the Pacific Northwest and broader western region of the U.S. Founded in 1935, the museum has strong roots in the community and anchors the university and museum district in downtown Tacoma.

History
The Tacoma Art Museum developed out of the Tacoma Art League, an informal gathering that began around 1891. In the 1930s, it was renamed the Tacoma Art Society, before finally becoming the Tacoma Art Museum in 1964. The museum is dedicated to collecting and exhibiting the visual arts of the American Northwest, with the mission of bringing people together through art. The museum's permanent collection includes the premier collection of Tacoma native Dale Chihuly’s glass artwork, on permanent public display.

In 1971, the L. T. Murray family (owners of the Murray Pacific Northwest timber company) gave the Tacoma Art Museum a three-story building at 12th Street and Pacific Avenue. Built in 1922, the building at 1123 Pacific Avenue previously housed the National Bank of Tacoma. 

In May 2003, the Tacoma Art Museum moved into a 50,000 square foot (4,650 m2) building located at 1701 Pacific Avenue, which was designed by Antoine Predock. The $22 million steel and glass structure nearly doubled the available space, allowing the museum to exhibit more of its permanent collection. In designing the building, Predock drew inspiration from the region's light and its relationship to the water, Mount Rainier, the Thea Foss Waterway, and the neighborhood's industrial history and character in what is now known as the Tacoma Museum District.

A $15.5 million building project expansion designed by Olson Kundig Architects was completed in November 2014. The expansion, which houses the Haub Family Collection of Western American Art, added approximately 16,000 square feet (1500 m2) to the museum.

From 2005 to 2017, Stephanie Stebich served as Executive Director. She was preceded by Janeanne Upp and succeeded by David F. Setford.

Curatorial information
The museum exhibits more than 3,000 pieces in its collection, two-thirds of which are classified as Northwest art. Since 1934, Tacoma Art Museum has built a permanent collection that includes work from artists such as Mary Cassatt, Jean-Baptiste-Camille Corot, Edgar Degas, Robert Henri, Edward Hopper, Robert Rauschenberg, Pierre-Auguste Renoir, Jacob Lawrence, John Singer Sargent, and Andrew Wyeth.

Nearly seventy percent of the collection consists of works from Northwest artists such as Guy Anderson, Morris Graves, Jacob Lawrence, Jared Pappas-Kelley, Akio Takamori, Mark Tobey, and Patti Warashina. Untitled - Stone Wave, a major work by Seattle-based sculptor Richard Rhodes, occupies the central court of the museum.

The museum is known as being more open to overtly gay or queer art than most American museums. In 2012, it presented the Hide/Seek show that was censored at the National Portrait Gallery; TAM intended to present the show uncensored. The museum also planned to follow with another show curated by Jonathan Katz: Art, AIDS, America.

Exhibitions

Permanent Collections 

 The Christopher and Alida Latham Display 
 Dale Chihuly at Tacoma Art Museum 
 Metaphor into Form: Art in the Era of the Pilchuck Glass School 
 Martin Blank's Current 
 Richard Rhodes' Untitled 
 Outdoor Sculptures at TAM

Current Exhibitions 

 Animals: Wild and Captured in Bronze 
 On Native Land: Landscapes from the Haub Family Collection 
 Native Portraiture: Power and Perception 
 Places to Call Home: Settlements in the West 
 Winter in the West 
 Painting Deconstructed: Selections from the Northwest Collection 
 Benaroya Project Space: Glass as Canvas

References

External links
Official website

Art museums and galleries in Washington (state)
Museums in Tacoma, Washington
Institutions accredited by the American Alliance of Museums
Antoine Predock buildings
1935 establishments in Washington (state)